Little Lord Fauntleroy is a novel by Frances Hodgson Burnett. It was published as a serial in St. Nicholas Magazine from November 1885 to October 1886, then as a book by Scribner's (the publisher of St. Nicholas) in 1886. The illustrations by Reginald B. Birch set fashion trends and the novel set a precedent in copyright law when Burnett won a lawsuit in 1888 against E. V. Seebohm over the rights to theatrical adaptations of the work.

Etymology
The titular surname Fauntleroy is an Anglo-French term ultimately derived from Le enfant le roy ("child of the king"), evoking the image of being pampered and spoiled. More proximally, it is from a Middle English variant faunt from enfaunt, meaning child or infant. It is attested as a real surname since the 13th Century.

Plot
In a shabby New York City side street in the mid-1880s, young Cedric Errol lives with his mother (known to him as "Dearest") in genteel poverty after the death of his father, Captain Cedric Errol. One day, they are visited by an English lawyer named Havisham with a message from young Cedric's grandfather, the Earl of Dorincourt, a millionaire who despises the United States and was very disappointed when his youngest son married an American woman. With the deaths of his father's elder brothers, Cedric has now inherited the title Lord Fauntleroy and is the heir to the earldom and a vast estate. Cedric's grandfather wants him to live in England and be educated as an English aristocrat. He offers his son's widow a house and guaranteed income, but he refuses to have anything to do with her, even after she declines his money.

However, the Earl is impressed by the appearance and intelligence of his American grandson and is charmed by his innocent nature. Cedric believes his grandfather to be an honorable man and benefactor, and the Earl cannot disappoint him. The Earl therefore becomes a benefactor to his tenants, to their delight, though he takes care to let them know that their benefactor is the child, Lord Fauntleroy.

Meanwhile, back in New York, a homeless bootblack named Dick Tipton tells Cedric's old friend Mr. Hobbs, a New York City grocer, that a few years prior, after the death of his parents, Dick's older brother Benjamin married an awful woman who got rid of their only child together after he was born and then left. Benjamin moved to California to open a cattle ranch while Dick ended up in the streets. At the same time, a neglected pretender to Cedric's inheritance appears in England, the pretender's mother claiming that he is the offspring of the Earl's eldest son, Bevis. The claim is investigated by Dick and Benjamin, who come to England and recognize the woman as Benjamin's former wife. She flees, and the Tipton brothers and the pretender, Benjamin's son, do not see her again. Afterward, Benjamin goes back to his cattle ranch in California where he happily raises his son by himself. The Earl is reconciled to his American daughter-in-law, realizing that she is far superior to the impostor.

The Earl had planned to teach his grandson how to be an aristocrat. Instead, Cedric teaches his grandfather that an aristocrat should practice compassion towards those dependent on him. The Earl becomes the man Cedric always innocently believed him to be. Cedric is happily reunited with his mother and with Mr. Hobbs, who decides to stay to help look after Cedric.

Impact on fashion

The Fauntleroy suit (see also Buster Brown suit), so well described by Burnett and realised in Reginald Birch's detailed pen-and-ink drawings, created a fad for formal dress for American middle-class children:

The Fauntleroy suit appeared in Europe as well but nowhere was it as popular as in America. The classic Fauntleroy suit was a velvet cut-away jacket and matching knee pants, worn with a fancy blouse and a large lace or ruffled collar. These suits appeared right after the publication of Burnett's story (1885) and were a major fashion for boys until after the turn of the 20th century. Many boys who did not wear an actual Fauntleroy suit wore suits with Fauntleroy elements, such as a fancy blouse or floppy bow. Only a minority of boys wore ringlet curls with these suits, but the photographic record confirms that many boys did.

It was most popular for boys about 3–8 years of age, but some older boys wore them as well. It has been speculated that the popularity of the style encouraged many mothers to breech their boys earlier than before, and it was a factor in the decline of the fashion for dressing small boys in dresses and other skirted garments. Clothing that Burnett popularised was modelled on the costumes which she tailored herself for her two sons, Vivian and Lionel.

Reception 
Polly Hovarth writes that Little Lord Fauntleroy "was the Harry Potter of his time and Frances Hodgson Burnett was as celebrated for creating him as J. K. Rowling is for Potter". During the serialisation in St. Nicholas magazine, readers looked forward to new installments. The fashions in the book became popular with velvet Lord Fauntleroy suits being sold, as well as other Fauntleroy merchandise such as velvet collars, playing cards, and chocolates. During a period when sentimental fiction was the norm, and in the United States the "rags to riches" story popular, Little Lord Fauntleroy was a hit.

Edith Nesbit included in her own children's book The Enchanted Castle (1907) a rather unflattering reference:

Gerald could always make himself look interesting at a moment's notice (...) by opening his grey eyes rather wide, allowing the corners of his mouth to droop, and assuming a gentle, pleading expression, resembling that of the late little Lord Fauntleroy who must, by the way, be quite old now, and an awful prig.

Adaptations

Stage

In 1888, after discovering her novel had been plagiarized for the stage, Burnett successfully sued and then wrote her own theatrical adaptation of Little Lord Fauntleroy. It opened on 14 May, at Terry's Theatre in London, and was presented in the English provinces, France, Boston and New York City.

The Broadway production of Burnett's play opened on 10 December 1888, at the Broadway Theatre, New York City. The original cast follows:
 Earl of Dorincourt –  J. H. Gilmour
 Cedric Errol (Lord Fauntleroy) – Elsie Leslie and Tommy Russell
 Mr. Havisham, a Solicitor – F. F. Mackay
 Mr. Hobbs, a Grocer – George A. Parkhurst
 Dick, a Bootblack – Frank E. Lamb
 Higgins, a Farmer – John Swinburne
 Wilkins, a Groom – Alfred Klein
 Thomas, a Footman – John Sutherland
 James, a Servant – T. J. Plunkett
 Mrs. Errol ("Dearest") – Kathryn Kidder
 Minna – Alice Fischer
 Mary – Effie Germon

Touring versions of the play were common in the late 19th and early 20th century. A 1906 version cast 11 year old Buster Keaton in the role of Lord Fauntleroy.
 
In 1994, an Australian open-air/site specific theatre production of Little Lord Fauntleroy, adapted by Julia Britton and directed by Robert Chuter, was presented in the historical gardens of the National Trust of Australia (Victoria) property Rippon Lea.

Film and television

 Little Lord Fauntleroy (1914), a British silent film, one of the last made in Kinemacolor, directed by F. Martin Thornton, starring Gerald Royston (Cedric); H. Agar Lyons (The Earl); Jane Wells (Dearest); Bernard Vaughan (Mr. Havisham); F. Tomkins (Mr. Hobbs); and Harry Edwards (Dick).
 Little Lord Fauntleroy (A Kis Lord) (1918), a Hungarian silent film, directed by Alexander Antalffy, starring Tibor Lubinszky (Cedric); Alexander Antalffy (The Earl); Giza Báthory (Dearest); József Hajdú (Mr. Havisham); Jenõ Horváth (Mr. Hobbs); Ernõ Kenessey (Dick).
 Little Lord Fauntleroy (1921), an American silent film, directed by Alfred E. Green and Jack Pickford, starring Mary Pickford (Cedric & Dearest); Claude Gillingwater (The Earl); Joseph J. Dowling (Mr. Havisham); James A. Marcus (Mr. Hobbs); Fred Malatesta (Dick).
 L'ultimo Lord (1926), an Italian silent film, directed by Augusto Genina, starring Carmen Boni (Freddie). Based on L'ultimo Lord by Ugo Falena.
 Little Lord Fauntleroy (1936), arguably the best-known adaptation, directed by John Cromwell, starring Freddie Bartholomew (Cedric); C. Aubrey Smith (The Earl); Dolores Costello (Dearest); Henry Stephenson (Mr. Havisham); Guy Kibbee (Mr. Hobbs); Mickey Rooney (Dick).
 Il ventesimo duca (1945), an Italian film, directed by Lucio De Caro, starring Paola Veneroni ("Freddie"). Based on L'ultimo Lord by Ugo Falena.
 O Pequeno Lorde (1957), Brazilian TV movie, directed da Júlio Gouveia and Antonino Seabra, starring Rafael Neto (Cedric).
 Little Lord Fauntleroy (1957), an American TV miniseries, starring Richard O'Sullivan (Cedric).
 Il piccolo Lord (1960), an Italian TV miniseries (sceneggiato) aired on RAI, directed by Vittorio Brignole, starring  Sandro Pistolini (Cedric); Michele Malaspina (The Earl); Andreina Paul (Dearest); Attilio Ortolani (Mr. Havisham); Giuseppe Mancini (Mr. Hobbs); Ermanno Anfossi (Dick).
 Lille Lord Fauntleroy (1966), a Norwegian TV film, directed by Alfred Solaas, starring Gøsta Hagenlund (Cedric).
 Il Piccolo Lord (1971), an Italian TV movie, directed by Luciano Emmer, starring Ellen and Alice Kessler, Johnny Dorelli, Dina Perbellini, and Alice Rossi.
 Little Lord Fauntleroy (1976), a BBC TV miniseries, directed by Paul Annett, starring Glenn Anderson (Cedric); Paul Rogers (the Earl); Jennie Linden (Dearest); Preston Lockwood (Mr. Havisham); Ray Smith (Mr. Hobbs); Paul D'Amato (Dick).
 As one installment in 1977 of the late 1970s children's television show Once Upon a Classic.
 Little Lord Fauntleroy (1980), a popular adaptation, directed by Jack Gold, starring Ricky Schroder (Cedric); Alec Guinness (The Earl); Connie Booth (Dearest); Eric Porter (Mr. Havisham); Colin Blakely (Mr. Hobbs); and Rolf Saxon (Dick). This film has become a Christmas classic in Germany.
 The Adventures of Little Lord Fauntleroy was an 1982 TV movie, directed by Desmond Davis and starring Jerry Supiran (Cedric); John Mills (The Earl), and Caroline Smith (Dearest).
 Little Lord Fauntleroy (1988), a Japanese anime series, also known as Shōkōshi Cedie (小公子セディ Shōkōshi Sedi, trans. Little Prince Cedie), directed by Kōzō Kusuba, spanning 43 episodes (20–25-minute each per episode) based on the same novel. The anime has been translated in many languages, notably French, German, Italian, Spanish, Dutch, Tagalog, Polish and Arabic. In this adaptation (and in the Filipino film adaptation based on it), Cedric's mother is named "Annie", and his father, "James" (in contrast to the novel's namesake), who was seen alive in the early episodes of the series until his untimely demise on episode five.
 Il Piccolo Lord/Der kleine Lord (1994), an Italian and German co–production TV movie, aired on RAI and ARD, directed by Gianfranco Albano, starring Francesco De Pasquale (Cedric) and Mario Adorf (The Earl).
 Little Lord Fauntleroy (1995), a BBC TV mini-series adaptation by Julian Fellowes, directed by Andrew Morgan, starring Michael Benz (Cedric) and George Baker (The Earl).
 Cedie: Ang Munting Prinsipe (Cedie: The Little Prince) (1996), a Filipino film adaptation, directed by Romy Suzara, starring Tom Taus.
 Radosti i pechali malenʹkogo lorda (Little lord's joy and sorrow) (Радости и печали маленького лорда) (2003), a Russian film, directed by Ivan Popov, starring Aleksey Vesyolkin (Cedric).
  (2012), an Austrian TV movie aired on ZDF, directed by Gernot Roll, starring Philippa Schöne in the role of a little Countess.

References

Sources 
 
 Rutherford, L.M. (1994), "British Children's Writers 1880–1914", in Laura M. Zaldman, Dictionary of Literary Biography, Volume 141, Detroit: Gale Research Literature Resource Center

External links
 
 
 
  
 
  Little Lord Fauntleroy suits

1880s fashion
1886 British novels
1886 American novels
American children's novels
American novels adapted into films
American novels adapted into plays
British novels adapted into films
British novels adapted into plays
Children's clothing
English-language novels
Novels adapted into operas
American novels adapted into television shows
British novels adapted into television shows
Novels by Frances Hodgson Burnett
Novels first published in serial form
Works originally published in St. Nicholas Magazine
1880s children's books